The Biasca–Acquarossa railway (BA) was a Swiss metre gauge railway that linked the towns of Biasca and Acquarossa, in the canton of Ticino.

The Gotthard railway opened in 1882, providing a transport link to the communities of the valley of the Ticino River. In order to provide a link to the communities of the Valle di Blenio, the Biasca–Acquarossa railway was opened in 1911. The line closed in 1973 and was replaced by a bus service.

The main depot of the line in Biasca, which was built in the late 1960s, is in use as a bus depot by Autolinee Bleniesi, who operate bus services including those replacing the railway. The line's Acquarossa terminus is also used by the same company.

References

External links 
 
 Unofficial web site with pictures and plans

Closed railway lines in Switzerland
Metre gauge railways in Switzerland
SEFT
Railway lines opened in 1911
Railway lines closed in 1973
Transport in Ticino
1911 establishments in Switzerland